Sose, SOSE or SoSE may refer to:

Acronyms
Service-oriented software engineering, a software engineering methodology
System of systems engineering (SoSE), a methodology

People
Sose Mayrig (1868–1953), Armenian 
Sosé Onasakenrat (1845–1881), Mohawk chief

Other uses 
Sose International Film Festival, held in Yerevan, Armenia, since 2014